Solanum violaceum is a  flowering plant in the family Solanaceae that is found in China at elevations of 100 to 2700 meters.

Traditional uses
Solanum violaceum belongs to Solanaceae family which are extensively used as vegetables and fruits. It has also been used for variety of traditional medicinal treatment including asthma, dry cough, catarrh, colic, flatulence, worms, and fever. Different parts of the plant such as roots, fruits, seeds are used for different treatments. Roots are digestive, carminative, and astringent to the bowels, cardiac tonic, expectorant, and aphrodisiac while fruits are asthma, dry cough, catarrh, colic, flatulence, worms, and fever. Fruits are also used to relieve cough, alleviate toothache, and topically for skin disease. Seeds are mostly used to extravagance gonorrhoeic and dysuria. The indigenous Garo people of Bangladesh mix the seed with liquor to increase its intoxication effect.

The root extract of Solanum violaceum can also be used to treat obesity-related conditions.

References

External links
 
 

violaceum
Flora of China
Plants described in 1798